A beam splitter or beamsplitter is an optical device that splits a beam of light into a transmitted and a reflected beam. It is a crucial part of many optical experimental and measurement systems, such as interferometers, also finding widespread application in fibre optic telecommunications.

Designs
In its most common form, a cube, a beam splitter is made from two triangular glass prisms which are glued together at their base using polyester, epoxy, or urethane-based adhesives. (Before these synthetic resins, natural ones were used, e.g. Canada balsam.) The thickness of the resin layer is adjusted such that (for a certain wavelength) half of the light incident through one "port" (i.e., face of the cube) is reflected and the other half is transmitted due to FTIR (Frustrated Total Internal Reflection). Polarizing beam splitters, such as the Wollaston prism, use birefringent materials to split light into two beams of orthogonal polarization states.

Another design is the use of a half-silvered mirror. This is composed of an optical substrate, which is often a sheet of glass or plastic, with a partially transparent thin coating of metal. The thin coating can be aluminium deposited from aluminium vapor using a physical vapor deposition method. The thickness of the deposit is controlled so that part (typically half) of the light, which is incident at a 45-degree angle and not absorbed by the coating or substrate material, is transmitted and the remainder is reflected. A very thin half-silvered mirror used in photography is often called a pellicle mirror. To reduce loss of light due to absorption by the reflective coating, so-called "Swiss-cheese" beam-splitter mirrors have been used. Originally, these were sheets of highly polished metal perforated with holes to obtain the desired ratio of reflection to transmission. Later, metal was sputtered onto glass so as to form a discontinuous coating, or small areas of a continuous coating were removed by chemical or mechanical action to produce a very literally "half-silvered" surface.

Instead of a metallic coating, a dichroic optical coating may be used. Depending on its characteristics, the ratio of reflection to transmission will vary as a function of the wavelength of the incident light. Dichroic mirrors are used in some ellipsoidal reflector spotlights to split off unwanted infrared (heat) radiation, and as output couplers in laser construction.

A third version of the beam splitter is a dichroic mirrored prism assembly which uses dichroic optical coatings to divide an incoming light beam into a number of spectrally distinct output beams.  Such a device was used in three-pickup-tube color television cameras and the three-strip Technicolor movie camera. It is currently used in modern three-CCD cameras. An optically similar system is used in reverse as a beam-combiner in three-LCD projectors, in which light from three separate monochrome LCD displays is combined into a single full-color image for projection.

Beam splitters with single-mode fiber for PON networks use the single-mode behavior to split the beam. The splitter is done by physically splicing two fibers "together" as an X.

Arrangements of mirrors or prisms used as camera attachments to photograph stereoscopic image pairs with one lens and one exposure are sometimes called "beam splitters", but that is a misnomer, as they are effectively a pair of periscopes redirecting rays of light which are already non-coincident. In some very uncommon attachments for stereoscopic photography, mirrors or prism blocks similar to beam splitters perform the opposite function, superimposing views of the subject from two different perspectives through color filters to allow the direct production of an anaglyph 3D image, or through rapidly alternating shutters to record sequential field 3D video.

Phase shift

Beam splitters are sometimes used to recombine beams of light, as in a Mach–Zehnder interferometer. In this case there are two incoming beams, and potentially two outgoing beams. But the amplitudes of the two outgoing beams are the sums of the (complex) amplitudes calculated from each of the incoming beams, and it may result that one of the two outgoing beams has amplitude zero. In order for energy to be conserved (see next section), there must be a phase shift in at least one of the outgoing beams. For example (see red arrows in picture on the right), if a polarized light wave in air hits a dielectric  surface such as glass, and the electric field of the light wave is in the plane of the surface, then the reflected wave will have a phase shift of π, while the transmitted wave will not have a phase shift; the blue arrow does not pick up a phase-shift, because it is reflected from a medium with a lower refractive index. The behavior is dictated by the Fresnel equations.
This does not apply to partial reflection by conductive (metallic) coatings, where other phase shifts occur in all paths (reflected and transmitted). In any case, the details of the phase shifts depend on the type and geometry of the beam splitter.

Classical lossless beam splitter
For beam splitters with two incoming beams, using a classical, lossless beam splitter with electric fields Ea and Eb each incident at one of the inputs, the two output fields Ec and Ed are linearly related to the inputs through

where the 2×2 element  is the beam-splitter transfer matrix and r and t are the reflectance and transmittance along a particular path through the beam splitter, that path being indicated by the subscripts. (The values depend on the polarization of the light.)

If the beam splitter removes no energy from the light beams, the total output energy can be equated with the total input energy, reading

Inserting the results from the transfer equation above with  produces 

and similarly for then  

where "" indicates the complex conjugate. It is now easy to show that  where  is the identity, i.e. the beam-splitter transfer matrix is a unitary matrix.

Expanding, it can be written each r and t as a complex number having an amplitude and phase factor; for instance, . The phase factor accounts for possible shifts in phase of a beam as it reflects or transmits at that surface. Then is obtained

Further simplifying, the relationship becomes

which is true when  and the exponential term reduces to -1. Applying this new condition and squaring both sides, it becomes

where substitutions of the form  were made. This leads to the result

and similarly,

It follows that .
 
Having determined the constraints describing a lossless beam splitter, the initial expression can be rewritten as

Applying different values for the amplitudes and phases can account for many different forms of the beam splitter that can be seen widely used. 

To include the constraints and simplify to 4 independent parameters, we may write  (and from the constraint ), so that

Lastly using the other constraint that  we define 
so that ,  hence

A 50:50 beam splitter is produced when . The dielectric beam splitter above, for example, has 

i.e. , while the "symmetric" beam splitter of Loudon  has 

i.e. .

Use in experiments 
Beam splitters have been used in both thought experiments and real-world experiments in the area of quantum theory and relativity theory and other fields of physics.  These include:
 The Fizeau experiment of 1851 to measure the speeds of light in water
 The Michelson–Morley experiment of 1887 to measure the effect of the (hypothetical) luminiferous aether on the speed of light
 The Hammar experiment of 1935 to refute Dayton Miller's claim of a positive result from repetitions of the Michelson-Morley experiment
 The Kennedy–Thorndike experiment of 1932 to test the independence of the speed of light and the velocity of the measuring apparatus
 Bell test experiments (from ca. 1972) to demonstrate consequences of quantum entanglement and exclude local hidden-variable theories
 Wheeler's delayed choice experiment of 1978, 1984 etc., to test what makes a photon behave as a wave or a particle and when it happens
 The FELIX experiment (proposed in 2000) to test the Penrose interpretation that quantum superposition depends on spacetime curvature
 The Mach–Zehnder interferometer, used in various experiments, including the Elitzur–Vaidman bomb tester involving interaction-free measurement; and in others in the area of quantum computation

Quantum mechanical description 
In quantum mechanics, the electric fields are operators as explained by second quantization and Fock states. Each electrical field operator can further be expressed in terms of modes representing the wave behavior and amplitude operators, which are typically represented by the dimensionless creation and annihilation operators. The following is a simplified version of Ref.

where the transfer matrix is given in  classical lossless beam splitter section above:

Since  is unitary, i.e.

This is equivalent to saying that if we start from the vacuum state  and add a photon in port a to produce 
 
then the beam splitter creates a superposition on the outputs of 

Likewise, for any input state  

and the output is

Using the multi-binomial theorem, this can be written

The transmission/reflection coefficient factor in the last equation may be written in terms of the reduced parameters that ensure unitarity:

where it can be seen that if the beam splitter is 50:50 then  and the only factor that depends on j is the  term. This factor causes interesting interference cancellations. For example, if   and the beam splitter is 50:50, then
  
where the  term has cancelled. Therefore the output states always have even numbers of photons in each arm. Note that this is true for all types of 50:50 beam splitter irrespective of the details of the phases, and the photons need only be indistinguishable. This contrasts with the classical result, in which equal output in both arms for equal inputs on a 50:50 beam splitter does appear for specific beam splitter phases (e.g. a symmetric beam splitter ), and for other phases where the output goes to one arm (e.g. the dielectric beam splitter ) the output is always in the same arm, not random in either arm as is the case here. From the  correspondence principle we might expect the  quantum results to tend to the classical one in the limits of large n, but the appearance of large numbers of indistinguishable photons at the input is a non-classical state that does not correspond to a classical field pattern, which instead produces a statistical mixture of different  known as Poissonian light.

Rigorous derivation is given in the Fearn–Loudon 1987 paper and extended in Ref  to include statistical mixtures with the density matrix.

Non-symmetric beam-splitter 
In general, for a non-symmetric beam-splitter, namely a beam-splitter for which the transmission and reflection coefficients are not equal, one can define an angle  such that

Then the unitary operation associated with the beam-splitter is then

Application for quantum computing 
In 2000 Knill, Laflamme and Milburn (KLM protocol) proved that it is possible to create a universal quantum computer solely with beam splitters, phase shifters, photodetectors and single photon sources. The states that form a qubit in this protocol are the one-photon states of two modes, i.e. the states |01⟩ and |10⟩ in the occupation number representation (Fock state) of two modes. Using these resources it is possible to implement any single qubit gate and 2-qubit probabilistic gates. The beam splitter is an essential component in this scheme since it is the only one that creates entanglement between the Fock states.

Similar settings exist for continuous-variable quantum information processing. In fact, it is possible to simulate arbitrary Gaussian (Bogoliubov) transformations of a quantum state of light by means of beam splitters, phase shifters and photodetectors, given two-mode squeezed vacuum states are available as a prior resource only (this setting hence shares certain similarities with a Gaussian counterpart of the KLM protocol). The building block of this simulation procedure is the fact that a beam splitter is equivalent to a squeezing transformation under partial time reversal.

Diffractive beam splitter

See also
Power dividers and directional couplers

References

Mirrors
Optical components
Microscopy